State Route 8 (SR 8) is a primary state highway in the U.S. state of Virginia.  The state highway runs  from the North Carolina state line near Palmetto, where the highway continues south as North Carolina Highway 8 (NC 8), north to U.S. Route 11 (US 11) in Christiansburg.  SR 8 is part of a  two-state highway 8 system and is the main north–south highway of Patrick County, Floyd County, and southern Montgomery County, connecting their respective county seats of Stuart, Floyd, and Christiansburg with each other and with the Blue Ridge Parkway.  The state highway also links the New River Valley region of Virginia with Southside Virginia via US 58 and the Piedmont Triad of North Carolina via NC 8.

Route description

SR 8 begins at the North Carolina state line near Palmetto.  The road continues south as NC 8, which passes through Lawsonville on its way to Winston-Salem.  SR 8 heads northwest as Salem Highway, which meets the eastern end of SR 103 (Dry Pond Highway) in Five Forks.  The state highway enters the town of Stuart by crossing the South Fork Mayo River.  SR 8 follows South Main Street, first passing SR 8 Business, then Wood Brothers Drive. At Blue Ridge Street, the state highway turns west and joins US 58 Business on a concurrency west of the downtown area.  Northwest of the town, SR 8 joins US 58 (Jeb Stuart Highway) north through a narrow creek valley to Cruzes Store.

SR 8 continues northeast as Woolwine Highway through narrow creek valleys to an intersection with SR 57 (Fairystone Park Highway) near Buffalo Ridge.  The state highway crosses the Smith River shortly before meeting the west end of SR 40 (Charity Highway) in Woolwine.  East of Rocky Knob, the namesake of an American Viticultural Area, SR 8 curvaceously ascends Blue Ridge Mountain to the Eastern Continental Divide at Tuggle Gap.  At the gap, the state highway enters Floyd County and has an interchange with the Blue Ridge Parkway.

SR 8 continues north as Parkway Lane to the county seat of Floyd, where the highway follows Locust Street and intersects US 221 (Main Street).  The state highway traverses the West Fork of the Little River and climbs over Wills Ridge south of the confluence of the rivers West and East forks.  SR 8 crosses over the main stem of the river at the Montgomery county line, where the highway continues as Riner Road through the village of Riner in the Union Valley.  The state highway enters the town of Christiansburg at its diamond interchange with Interstate 81.  SR 8 follows Main Street to its northern terminus at US 11.  US 11 heads west as Radford Street and north as Main Street to the center of the town.

History
SR 8 was included in the initial 1918 state highway system as part of State Route 23, which continued north to West Virginia via present U.S. Route 460. In the 1933 renumbering, SR 23 was renumbered State Route 8 because the number was used by U.S. Route 23. The short piece west from Rich Creek to West Virginia became part of U.S. Route 219 by 1937, and U.S. Route 460 replaced the entire route north of Christiansburg by 1947.

Major intersections

SR 8 Business

SR 8 Business (SR 8 Bus.) is a  special route of SR 8 in the town of Stuart. The route is a former alignment of SR 8 in downtown Stuart along Patrick Avenue and Blue Ridge Street (the latter of which is part of US 58 Bus.). The highway was designated after 2011 when a new alignment of SR 8 was constructed allowing the bypass of downtown Stuart especially by heavy truck traffic.

The route begins at a signalized intersection with Salem Highway (SR 8) in a small commercial area immediately north of the South Mayo River. SR 8 Bus. and Patrick Avenue, after first heading east, immediately heads north paralleling SR 8. At the summit of the hill, SR 8 Bus. reaches Blue Ridge Street which carries US 58 Bus.; SR 8 Bus. turns northwest onto it and after a pair of 90-degree turns, enters the Stuart Uptown Historic District and passes the Patrick County Courthouse. SR 8 Bus. ends at an intersection with Wood Brothers Drive where SR 8 and US 58 Bus. continue together northwest.

References

External links

Virginia Highways Project: VA 8

008
State Route 008
State Route 008
State Route 008